The Berliner Symphoniker (Berlin Symphony Orchestra) is a German symphony orchestra based in Berlin, Germany.

History
The orchestra began its performing activity on 1 September 1967 as Symphonisches Orchester Berlin, under the auspices of the Berliner Orchestervereinigung e.V., after the merger of two independent orchestras, the Berliner Symphonisches Orchester and the Deutsches Symphonie-Orchester.  Carl August Bünte, who had been chief conductor of the Berliner Symphonisches Orchester, was the first chief conductor of the newly formed ensemble, and held the position until 1973.  From 1967 to 1990, the orchestra performed as the Symphonisches Orchester Berlin.  In 1990, the orchestra was renamed the Berliner Symphoniker.  

In 2004, the Berlin Senate withdrew its support of the orchestra, which subsequently entered bankruptcy proceedings.  Subsequently, the Berolina Orchester eV association took over management of the orchestra.  Since 2019, the current Intendantin (managing director) of the orchestra is Sabine Völker, the first woman to hold the post.

The longest-serving chief conductor of the orchestra was Lior Shambadal, from 1996 to 2019.  In April 2021, the orchestra announced the appointment of Hansjörg Schellenberger as its next chief conductor, effective with the 2021-2022 season.

Concert tours
 1996: Brazil
 1998–2000: USA, Egypt, United Kingdom, Spain, Switzerland, Italy
 2001: Italy, United Kingdom, South America
 2002: Japan
 2004: Japan, Hungary, Czech Republic, Frankfurt am Main
 2005: South Korea, China, Switzerland, Italy, Greece
 2006: Spain, Switzerland
 2007: Argentina (Buenos Aires; International Festival Ushuaia), Italy, Japan, China
 2008: Festival de Mallorca, Japan, China

Managing directors (Intendanten)
 Gerhard Becker (1967–1973)
 Franz Offermanns (1973–1976)
 Heinz Hoefs (1976–1978)
 Gideon Rosengarten (1978–1982)
 Norbert Thomas (1984–1988)
 Jochen Thärichen (1989–2017)
 Peter Paul Pachl (2017–2019)
 Sabine Völker (2019–present)

Chief conductors
 Carl August Bünte (1967–1973) 
 Theodore Bloomfield (1975–1982)
 Daniel Nazareth (1982–1985)
 Alun Francis (1989–1996)
 Lior Shambadal (1996–2019)
 Hansjörg Schellenberger (2021–present)

References

External link 
 Official website of the Berliner Symphoniker
 German-language history page on the Berliner Symphoniker
  

German symphony orchestras
Music in Berlin
Musical groups established in 1967
1967 establishments in Germany